The name Battle of Guadeloupe refers to a number of military operations that took place on or near the French island of Guadeloupe in the Caribbean Sea:

Siege of Guadeloupe (1703), an unsuccessful English siege during the War of the Spanish Succession
Battle of Guadeloupe (1759), a successful British invasion of the island during the Seven Years' War
Battle of Guadeloupe (1779), a naval engagement that took place off the French island of Guadeloupe between British Royal Navy ships and French Navy frigates
Invasion of Guadeloupe (1794), a temporarily successful British invasion, followed by a French one, during the French Revolutionary Wars
Battle of Guadeloupe (1810), a successful British invasion of the island during the Napoleonic Wars
Battle of Guadeloupe (1815), a successful British invasion of the island during the Hundred Days